The Royal Waltz (German: Königswalzer) is a 1955 West German musical film romance film directed by Victor Tourjansky starring Marianne Koch, Michael Cramer and Linda Geiser. It is a remake of the 1935 film of the same name, part of the tradition of operetta films. It was shot at the Bavaria Studios in Munich and the Carlton Studios in the same city. Location shooting took place in Munich's Englischer Garten and Nymphenburg Palace. The film's sets were designed by the art director Hermann Warm.

Synopsis
Austrian Count von Tettenbach is sent by Emperor Franz Joseph to Munich to ask the King of Bavaria Maximilian for the hand in marriage of his daughter Prinzessin Elisabeth. While there he falls in love with Therese, the daughter of a cafe owner and eventually marries her.

Cast

References

Bibliography
 Bock, Hans-Michael & Bergfelder, Tim. The Concise CineGraph. Encyclopedia of German Cinema. Berghahn Books, 2009.
 Waldman, Harry. Nazi Films in America, 1933–1942. McFarland, 2008.

External links 

Cinema.de

1955 films
1950s historical romance films
German historical romance films
West German films
1950s German-language films
Remakes of German films
Films directed by Victor Tourjansky
Films set in the 1850s
Films set in Munich
Cultural depictions of Empress Elisabeth of Austria
1950s German films
Films shot at Bavaria Studios
Films shot in Munich
Bavaria Film films
Operetta films